Volek (Czech feminine: Volková) is a surname. Notable people with the surname include:

 Billy Volek (born 1976), American football player
 David Volek (born 1966), Czech ice hockey player
 Jaroslav Volek (1923–1989), Czech musicologist
 Zdeněk Volek (born 1985), Czech footballer

Fictional characters
Nika Volek, a minor character on the American television series Prison Break

See also
 

Czech-language surnames